The 1999 Cal State Northridge Matadors football team represented California State University, Northridge as a member of the Big Sky Conference during the 1999 NCAA Division I-AA football season. Led by first-year head coach Jeff Kearin, Cal State Northridge finished the season with an overall record of 5–6 and a mark of 4–4 in conference play, placing fifth in the Big Sky. The Matadors played home games at North Campus Stadium in Northridge, California.

After the season ended, Northern Arizona was found to have used an ineligible player in six games and wasbe required to forfeit four victories, including a conference win over Cal State Northridge. The forfeit improved the Matadors' 1999 record to 6–5 overall and 5–3 in conference play and moved them up to fourth place in the Big Sky.

Schedule

References

Cal State Northridge
Cal State Northridge Matadors football seasons
Cal State Northridge Matadors football